David Jamison may refer to:
 David Jamison (skier)
 David Jamison (politician)

See also
 David Jamieson (disambiguation)
 David Jameson (disambiguation)